Earl Brown may refer to:

 Earl Brown (baseball) (1900–1980), American professional baseball player, journalist and politician
 Earl Brown (coach) (1915–2003), American football and basketball player and coach
 Earl Brown (general) (1927–2020), United States Air Force general
 Earl Brown (basketball, born 1952), Puerto Rican former basketball player
 Earl Jolly Brown (1939–2006), American actor
 W. Earl Brown (born 1963), American actor

See also
 Earle Brown (1926–2002), American composer
 Earle M. Brown (1926–1969), Virginia lawyer and member of the Virginia House of Delegates